Filippo Massaroni (born July 19, 1945, in Norcia) was an Italian bodybuilder. In his career he has won the championship title amateur NABBA, Mr Universe in 1981 .

Biography
After finishing his career as an athlete has become the national president of the National Amateur Bodybuilders Association.

Achievements
1976
 Mr Italy, 3°
1977
 European Championships - NABBA (Medium), 4°
 European Championships - WABBA (Medium), 4°

1979
 World Championships - WABBA (Medium), 2°

1980
 Mr. Universe - NABBA (Medium), 2°

1981
 Mr. Universe - NABBA (Medium), 1°

1984
 Mr. Universe - Pro - NABBA, 2°
 Championships - NABBA (Professional), 2°
 World Championships - WABBA (Professional), 5°

1985
 Mr. Universe - Pro - NABBA, 4°

See also
 AAU Mr. Universe

Notes

External links 
 Filippo Massaroni profile

1945 births
Living people
People from Norcia
Italian bodybuilders